Norman Coles Bailey (23 July 1857 – 13 January 1923) was an English footballer from the late 19th century who made 19 appearances for England playing at half back.

Playing career
Bailey was born in Streatham and was educated at Westminster School, whom he represented at football. He subsequently played for the Old Westminsters, Clapham Rovers, Wanderers, Swifts and Corinthian, as well as earning representative honours for Surrey and London. At his peak he was described as "a very safe half-back, with plenty of dash and judgement; he has both strength and pace and never misses his kick".

He was a member of the Clapham Rovers team that reached the FA Cup final twice, losing 1-0 to Old Etonians in 1879, and going on to win the cup in 1880 with a 1–0 win over Oxford University at The Kennington Oval.

He made 19 appearances (scoring once) for the England national football team between 1878 and 1887 (and was thus the first player to make more than ten appearances for his country) and captained England fifteen times.

He was a solicitor by profession, qualifying in 1880, and served on The FA Committee between 1882 and 1884, becoming vice-president from 1887 to 1890.

Honours
Clapham Rovers
FA Cup winner: 1880
FA Cup finalist: 1879

References

External links

Norman Bailey at englandfootballonline
Profile at www.englandcaps.co.uk
Corinthian Casuals F.C. - Player profiles

1857 births
Footballers from Streatham
1923 deaths
People educated at Westminster School, London
English footballers
England international footballers
Old Westminsters F.C. players
Clapham Rovers F.C. players
Corinthian F.C. players
Swifts F.C. players
Wanderers F.C. players
English solicitors
Association football defenders
FA Cup Final players